The Cocos-Keeling angelfish (Centropyge colini), or Colin's angelfish is a small species of ray-finned fish, a marine angelfish belonging to the family Pomacanthidae. It is found in the Indo-West Pacific region.

Description
The Cocos-Keeling angelfish is mainly lemon-yellow in colour with a wide blue stripe from the nape along the back to the middle of the dorsal fin. There is a thin purplish ring around the eye. The dorsal fin contains 14 spines and 16-17 soft rays while the anal fin has 3 spines and 17 soft rays.

Distribution
The Cocos-Keeling angelfish has been recorded from a scattering of sites in the Indo-West Pacific. These include the Spratly Islands, Palau, Papua New Guinea, Indonesia, Marshall Islands, Cocos Keeling Islands, Fiji and Guam, with an unconfirmed report from the Ogasawara Islands off Japan.

Habitat and biology
It is a shy and secretive species which lives in crevices and caves in deep reef drop offs. It is found in groups which consist of a male and a harem of 2-6 females. The male is replaced by the most dominant female if he disappears. Very little is known about the diet of this species.

Systematics
The Cocos-Keeling angelfish was first formally described in 1974 by William F. Smith-Vaniz and Ernest J. Randall (1924-2020) with the type locality given as Turks Reef in the Cocos-Keeling Islands. Some authorities place this species in the subgenus Centropyge.

Etymology
The specific name honours the biologist Patrick L. Colin who helped collect the type.

Utlisation
The Cocos-Keeling angelfish rarely appears in the aquarium trade.

References

Cocos-Keeling angelfish
Fauna of the Cocos (Keeling) Islands
Taxa named by William Farr Smith-Vaniz
Taxa named by John Ernest Randall
Cocos-Keeling angelfish